Haris Waheed (born 2 January 1994) is a Pakistani actor. Waheed is best known for portraying the role of Waqas Jutt in Momina Duraid's and Johns Hopkins University Center for Communication Programs drama serial Sammi, Zafar in Do Bol and Ilyas in Momina Duraid's And Kashf Foundation drama serial Udaari. All three of which rank highest rated Pakistani dramas, for which he received numerous accolades and recognition from audience.

Personal life 

Waheed was born on 2 January 1994 to Kashmiri family in Karachi. His Great grandfather, Abdul Majeed Butt, was married to famous Indian actress Munawar Sultana both separated during Majeed's migration to Pakistan after the Partition of India. Haris Waheed married to Pakistani actress, Maryam Fatima on 23 May 2018. However, the couple divorced in 2022.

Career 

Haris started his career as theater actor in National Academy of Performing Arts where he enrolled to complete his graduation in Acting, Screenwriting, and Directing. However, he did not complete his graduation but he has been an active part of International Theater Festival of Napa where he assisted Naseeruddin Shah and Ratna Pathak.He acted in numerous plays for Napa and as well for other productions including Musical theatre Avanti.He made guest appearance with Momina Duraid's Sadqay Tumhare and later made his television debut in Momina Duraid's Alvida in 2015, Directed by Shahzad Kashmiri. In 2016, Waheed starred as lead in Shaam Dhalay aired on Geo TV. In 2016 later, he played an interesting character Ilyas in Udaari, directed by Mohammed Ehteshamuddin aired On Hum TV. The show became big success and Waheed becomes a house hold name in Pakistani drama industry. In 2017, he essayed his breakthrough character and played lead antagonist "Waqas Jutt" in Momina Duraids and Johns Hopkins University drama serial Sammi directed by Saife Hasan aired on Hum TV. Sammi become one of the biggest hit of the year and he received critical acclaim for his character.

Due to his popularity in Udaari and Sammi, he bagged another role as antagonist in Bisaat-e-dil aired on Hum TV in 2018.
Later in 2018, he essayed another villain "Sameer" in serial Tu Jo Nahi and Naulakha, both aired on tvone. In the second half of 2018, he collaborated with Adnan Siddiqui production to be part of the most expensive period play of its time Ghughi (an adaptation of Amrita Pritam novel) and adaptation of Chandraprakash Dwivedi movie Pinjar. His character Sukhchand made Waheed to be seen in another dimension as an actor.

In 2019, Waheed essayed the character "Zafar" in drama Serial Do Bol directed by Wajhat Hussain aired on ARY Digital. Do Bol became massive success across Pakistan and he received positive response for his character. In 2019, he was cast in 7th Sky Entertainment soap, Piya Naam Ka Diya and ARY Digital soap, Pakeeza Phuppo. He made first appearance on-screen as couple with his wife Maryam Fatima in Mera Qasoor. Currently, he is playing a supporting character in Muqaddar. Haris also serve as an ambassador for Telenor Pakistan. In 2020, he appeared in numerous projects for 7th Sky Entertainment namely Muqaddar, Kasa-e-Dil, and also made appearance in anthologies Makafaat, Dikhawa and Aik Air Munafiq.

Filmography

Film

Television

References

External links 

Haris Waheed On IMDB

Instagram

1994 births
Living people
Pakistani male television actors
21st-century Pakistani male actors